Paralus may refer to:

 Paralus (place), a former place in Egypt
 Paralus (ship), an Athenian trireme
 Paralus, a son of Pericles, see Paralus and Xanthippus
 fighting words